Three ships of the Royal Navy have borne the name HMS Blackwood, after Vice-Admiral Sir Henry Blackwood:

  was a Captain-class frigate launched in 1942 and transferred to the Royal Navy under Lend-Lease. She was sunk in 1944.
  was a  launched in 1955 and broken up in 1976.

Royal Navy ship names